Samuel Ward King (May 23, 1786 – January 20, 1851) was the 15th Governor of Rhode Island from 1839 to 1843.

King was born in Johnston, Providence County, Rhode Island, to William Borden King and Welthian Walton.

He attended Brown University but did not graduate. He became a medical doctor and worked as a surgeon during the War of 1812.

In 1820 King was elected town clerk of Johnston. He became a Whig when the party was founded, and was a presidential elector in 1832. In 1838 he was elected to the Rhode Island Senate. He first became governor in 1839 when the legislature failed to grant a majority of votes to the three leading contenders. He was elected to three other terms.

During his administration as governor of Rhode Island he took a strong stand against the expanded voting franchise that led to the Dorr Rebellion in 1841 – 1842. President John Tyler refused to send in Federal troops at Governor King's request to suppress the uprising.

King married Catherine Latham Angell, with whom he had fourteen children.

He is buried in the King family plot in Johnston near the intersection of US Route 6A and Killingly Street.

References

External links 

 Political Graveyard biographical information.
 National Governors Association Biography
 

1786 births
1851 deaths
American surgeons
Brown University alumni
Dorr Rebellion
Governors of Rhode Island
People from Johnston, Rhode Island
Physicians from Rhode Island
Rhode Island Whigs
19th-century American politicians
1832 United States presidential electors
Rhode Island state senators
Burials in Rhode Island